Otto II the Generous may refer to:

Otto II, Margrave of Brandenburg (after 1147–1205)
Otto II, Duke of Brunswick-Lüneburg (about 1266–1330)